The 2013–14 Magyar Kupa (English: Hungarian Cup) was the 74th season of Hungary's annual knock-out cup football competition. It started with the first match of Round 1 on 7 August 2013 and ended with the Final held in May 2014 at Stadium Puskás Ferenc, Budapest. Debrecen were the defending champions, having won their sixth cup competition last season. The winner of the competition will qualify for the second qualifying round of the 2014–15 UEFA Europa League.

First round
Matches were played on 7, 10 & 11 August 2013 and involved the teams qualified through the local cup competitions during the previous season, Nemzeti Bajnokság III, Nemzeti Bajnokság II and the Nemzeti Bajnokság I teams.

|-
| colspan="3" style="background:#fcc;"|7 August 2013

|-
| colspan="3" style="background:#fcc;"|10 August 2013

|-
| colspan="3" style="background:#fcc;"|11 August 2013

|}

Second round
Matches were played on 28 August 2013 and involved teams qualified from the first round. The rest of the teams received a bye for the third round.

|-
| colspan="3" style="background:#fcc;"|27 August 2013

|-
| colspan="3" style="background:#fcc;"|28 August 2013

|}

Round of 64
Matches were played on 24 and 25 September 2013.

|-
| colspan="3" style="background:#fcc;"|24 September 2013

|-
| colspan="3" style="background:#fcc;"|25 September 2013

|}

Round of 32
Matches were played on 22, 29 and 30 October 2013.

Round of 16

First leg

Second leg

Quarter-finals

First leg

Second leg

Semi-finals

First leg

Second leg

Final

See also
 2013–14 Nemzeti Bajnokság I
 2013–14 Nemzeti Bajnokság II
 2013–14 Ligakupa

References

External links
 Official site 
 soccerway.com

2013–14 in Hungarian football
2013–14 domestic association football cups
2013-14